Dheeraj Sharma (born 20 February 1982) is a social worker and a documentary film maker based in Delhi, India. He is best known for directing the documentary film Nashebaaz- The Dying People of Delhi that is based on the topic of homeless drug addiction in Delhi.   His works are mostly based on exploring the dark subjects of society. He is also the director of the NGO - Team Pages. In 2017, a clip from his film became popular that showed the harsh reality of solvent abuse in homeless children in Delhi that later became an Internet Meme.

References

External links 
 

1982 births
Living people
Film directors from Delhi
Indian documentary film directors